The Desperadoes Steel Orchestra, also called Despers, are a steelband from Laventille in Trinidad, formed in 1945.

Origins and evolution
A number of youths in the Laventille Road area began calling their group Morocco/Dead End Kids, before some of them saw a movie entitled "The Desperadoes" at Royal Cinema on Charlotte in Port of Spain, Trinidad in 1943. The name Desperadoes as in Steelband first came out at carnival in 1947. There were several rival bands at the time: Sun Valley, Hill Sixty, the Crusaders, and Destination Tokyo. In the early 1950s, Wilfred "Speaker" Harrison and Donald "Jit" Steadman began bringing Mas and later a professional focus that saw the band sign a sponsorship deal with Coca-Cola in 1962 with the band name changing to the Coca-Cola Gay Desperadoes at the same time,

In the 1950s another group of youths from an area Ovid Alley, Laventille formed calling themselves Spike Jones. Ovid Alley will be changed to Desperslie Crescent in the late 1970's. However, the founders of Desperadoes said, there can be only one steelband here, so the young Spike Jones group had no choice but to merge into Desperadoes. Rudolph "Charlo" Charles, who came from Spike Jones was given the captaincy in 1961, and he brought in Mr. Beverly Griffith as an arranger.  Mr. Charles managed Desperadoes up to his passing in 1985. They band placed third in the first Panorama competition in 1963, 2nd in 1964. In 1965 the band's sponsor changed to the West Indian Tobacco Company, and they became the WITCO Gay Desperadoes. They won Panorama for the first time the in 1966, with a rendition of Mighty Sparrow's "Obeah Wedding". Charles recruited a few members away from other steelbands and transformed Desperadoes from a steelband into a STEEL ORCHESTRA. In later years he invited several pantuners such as Bertie Marshall to join. They dropped 'Gay' from the name in the 1970's. Under Rudolph Charles' leadership, the band won Panorama 6 times and Classical Music Festivals on 2 occasions. As of 2020, Desperadoes has 12 Panorama and 5 Classical victories.

The orchestra has worldwide appearances and has performed at the Royal Albert Hall in 1972, Carnegie Hall in 1987, and performed with the Opera singer Luciano Pavarotti in Barbados in 1997.

The late Raymond "Artie" Shaw was the first musician to conduct Desperadoes Steel Orchestra at their performance for Queen Elizabeth at the Royal Albert Hall in London, and the late, Insp. Anthony Prospect conducted their English tour in 1981.  The late Dr. Pat Bishop conducted their performance at Carnegie Hall in NYC. Desperadoes have also toured some of Trinidad & Tobago's motherlands; such as Africa, India, China, England and Grenada. The band has qualified for the most Panorama finals, 53 of 57 with {12} 1st, {6} 2nd and {9} 3rd. Desperadoes was a finalist for 36 consecutive years 1976 through 2011, has a winning average of (1) victory every 4.75 years as of 2020, has won every entered competition, and has a total of 21 combined MAJOR victories and 7 minor wins at various competitions, from 1965 to 2020.

In late May 2017, the band held elections, and Mr. Kenneth Collis was elected the 11th Manager since Mr. Rudolph Charles.

Education
Despers also make an effort to educate their community in Laventille, and has hosted Pan Camps with up to 200 children participating. Besides playing steelpan, the program includes foreign language training, life skills and field trips.

Competitions

Panorama
Despers have won the National Steelband Panorama competition of Trinidad and Tobago a total of twelve times in their history.  Their most recent win took place in 2020, where they won with a total of 286 points.

The orchestra always takes part in the 'Large Band' category, with a minimum of one hundred musicians.

Maximum players allowed in the 'Large Band' category.

Music Festival
Desperadoes have won the (Pan Is Beautiful) Steel Orchestra Music Festival of Trinidad and Tobago three times. They played the "Polovetsian Dances" by Borodin in 1986, the "Marche Slave" from Tchaikovsky in 1988 and the "Bartered Bride" by Smetana in 1992. Their classical renditions were all arranged and conducted by the late, Dr. Pat Bishop.                                              
Desperadoes have also won The Best Village Classical Competition for pan in 1965. They performed "The Marriage of Figaro", which was arranged By Mr. Beverly Griffith.
In 1967 they won The Champ of Champs Classical Competition. Their rendition of "Palaestra" and "The Merry Wives of Windsor" were arranged and conducted by the late Raymond "Artie" Shaw. Desperadoes Steel Orchestra has never lost a classical competition as a finalist.

Discography
Carnival In Trinidad (1965), RCA Victor - as Coca-Cola Gay Desperadoes Steel Orchestra
Triple Winners (1966), Recording Artists - as The West Indian Tobacco Gay Desperadoes Steel Orchestra
Caribbean Holiday (1966), Tropico/RCA - as Gay Desperadoes Steel Orchestra
Steelband Fiesta (1967), Tropico - as The West Indian Tobacco Gay Desperadoes Steel Orchestra
"Steel + Brass = Gold" (1968)
"Despers Classics Volume #1" (1969)
Calypso Rock (1971), Despers Productions
Classics With the Giants (197?), Bestway - as Gay Desperadoes Steel Orchestra, split with Solo Harmonites Steel Orchestra
Desperadoes (1981), Charisma - as Desperadoes
The Magical Music Of Despers (1991), Charlie's - as WITCO Gay Desperados
The Jammer (1991)
Live at Holder's, Barbados (1998)
Steel in the Classics (1999), Rituals Music

Compilations
The Best Of Despers (1977), Hildrina/Charlie's

Sources
 Voices from the Hills: Despers & Laventille - The steelband and its effects on poverty, stigma & violence in a community, by Ancil Anthony Neil, 1987.

References

Further reading
Franklin, Ian Desperadoes - Rudolph Charles Era and Beyond" by Ian Franklin
Franklin, Ian 400 Questions & Answers on Pan from 1960 to Present''

External links
 Despers on YouTube

Trinidad and Tobago musical groups
Steelbands
Musical groups established in 1950